Dilston may refer to:

 Dilston, Northumberland, a village and former civil parish in Northumberland, England close to Corbridge, the location of Dilston Castle
 Dilston, Tasmania, a suburb of Launceston in Australia